This is a list of current further education colleges and sixth form colleges in Wales.

Further education colleges offer courses for adult learners, including some academic qualifications, but mainly vocational studies and work-based learning. Sixth form colleges mainly offer academic qualifications such as A Levels for people between the ages of 16 and 19.

Some further education colleges in Wales offer higher education courses such as degrees and diplomas, usually in conjunction with a nearby university.

Welsh colleges are funded primarily by the Welsh Government, with subsidised tuition fees paid by individual students or their sponsors.

See also
 Education in Wales
 List of further education colleges in England
 List of further education colleges in Scotland
 List of further education colleges in Northern Ireland
 List of universities in Wales

References 

 
Further education colleges in Wales
Wal
Coll